Margarites gunnerusensis is a species of sea snail, a marine gastropod mollusk in the family Margaritidae.

Description

Distribution
This species occurs in Antarctic waters.

References

 Engl W. (2012) Shells of Antarctica. Hackenheim: Conchbooks. 402 pp.

gunnerusensis
Gastropods described in 1996